Jeanne-Mance Delisle (born June 24, 1941; some sources say 1939) is a Quebec writer.

The daughter of Rollande Fiset and Sebastien Delisle, she was born in Barraute and grew up in the Abitibi region of Quebec. She was a member of Théâtre de Coppe and the Centre dramatique de Rouyn. Her first play Un "reel" ben beau, ben triste was awarded the Prix littéraire Abitibi-Témiscamingue. She received the Governor General's Award for French-language drama in 1987 for Un oiseau vivant dans la gueule; the play was later translated into English as A live bird in its jaws. Delisle has written for both the theatre and television.

Selected works 
 Un rire oublié, play (1979)
 Le Mémoire d'or, play (1980)
 Nouvelles d'Abitibi, stories (1991), received the Grand Prix de la prose from the Journal de Montréal
 La bête rouge, novel (1996)

References 

1941 births
Living people
Canadian dramatists and playwrights in French
Governor General's Award-winning dramatists
Canadian women dramatists and playwrights
Canadian short story writers in French
Canadian novelists in French
Canadian women short story writers
Canadian women novelists
20th-century Canadian novelists
20th-century Canadian dramatists and playwrights
20th-century Canadian women writers
People from Abitibi-Témiscamingue
Writers from Quebec
20th-century Canadian short story writers